Battle of the Crna Bend may refer to:

 Battle of the Crna Bend (1916)
 Battle of the Crna Bend (1917)